Senator Padgett may refer to:

Joy Padgett (born 1947), Ohio State Senate
Lemuel P. Padgett (1855–1922), Tennessee State Senate